Triple Threat is a box set by Canadian thrash metal band Annihilator, released on January 27, 2017. It consists of a studio album solely featuring acoustic versions of many of the band's songs from over the years, a live CD featuring their set from the "Bang Your Head!!!" festival in 2016 and special editions feature a live DVD or Blu-ray.

Whereas Waters is known for recording all studio guitar and bass for Annihilator records himself, Waters said of this album: "This was one of the coolest things I have done in my long career. Having five people in a room, from all different backgrounds and talents, coming together to play songs from the past and to try to sound like we are one but totally live."

Track listing

Disc One

Disc two

Bonus Live DVD/Blu-ray

Personnel
Musicians
Jeff Waters – vocals, lead and rhythm guitar on all tracks
Aaron Homma – rhythm guitar on all tracks
Rich Hinks – bass on all tracks
Fabio Alessandrini – drums on live tracks
Marc LaFrance – vocals and drums on acoustic tracks
Pat Robillard – guitar on acoustic tracks

Audio Production
Live At The Bang Your Head Festival
Jeff Waters – Mixing, mastering
Arne Lakenmacher – Sound recording

Unplugged: The Watersound Studios Sessions
Jeff Waters – Recording, mixing, mastering
Rich Hinks – Recording
Marty Sobb – Recording
Kyle Herrick – Tape op

References

Annihilator (band) albums
2017 compilation albums